State Route 114 (SR 114), better known by its street name Willow Road, is a short, unsigned state highway in the U.S. state of California. It runs in San Mateo County from U.S. Route 101 in East Palo Alto to State Route 84 in Menlo Park west of the Dumbarton Bridge.

SR 114 was originally planned to stretch to I-280, but that portion was never constructed and has since been deleted from the legislative definition.

Route description
The route begins at U.S. Route 101 in East Palo Alto. From here, it heads east into Menlo Park. Here, it meets Hamilton Avenue and its east end at SR 84, which continues to the Dumbarton Bridge over the San Francisco Bay.

History
When defined in 1963, the route began at I-280 and ended at US 101. In 1984, a segment of SR 84 in the vicinity was swapped with SR 114, moving SR 114 from I-280 to SR 84, which followed Willow Road, as it does today. In 1990, however, the I-280 section was truncated and the terminus was switched to US 101.

Major intersections

See also

References

External links

California Highways: SR 114
Caltrans: Route 114 highway conditions
California @ AARoads.com - State Route 114

114
State Route 114
Menlo Park, California
State highways in the United States shorter than one mile